Agnano is a suburb of Napoli, Italy, situated southwest of the city in the Campi Flegrei region. It was popular among both ancient Greeks and Romans and was famed for its hot sulphurous springs.

History

Lake Agnano formed in the Middle Ages in the volcanic crater but was drained in 1870 to increase arable land and reduce the habitat of the Anopheles mosquito, which carries the malaria parasite. The crater is now home to the Agnano hippodrome and the town.

After World War II, Agnano was home to the U.S. Naval Support Activity consisting of the U.S. Naval Hospital, administrative offices, barracks, and two Department of Defense Education Activity schools: Naples Elementary School and Naples American High School.

Sights
The ruins of ancient thermal baths originally from the Greek period are visible although the existing structures date mainly from the Roman period of the 1st-2nd century AD. Magnificent mosaics and sculptures were discovered here. The remains are located in the grounds of the modern spa. They included an apodyterium, frigidarium, and several warm rooms (tepidaria, calidaria and laconica). The baths were probably part of a station beside the road from Neapolis and Puteoli and were fed by the Aqua Augusta (Serino aqueduct), which passed along the rim of the crater just above, as well as the local hot springs.

The Grotto of the Dog is nearby, an ancient cave, originally part of the baths, which fills with volcanic carbon dioxide which has killed animals that entered it.

Finds
A group of statues of muses, including the famous Frankfurt Urania, was discovered in the Roman baths and is now in the Liebieghaus museum. The figures, dating from 120-100BC, had been removed from their original location in ancient times and it is believed that they were originally from Delos near the temple of Apollo. The fine execution of the robes is especially skillful and their arrangement and textures emphasise the figures’ beautiful bodies. Although the condition of the group is somewhat fragmentary, the style is very naturalistic.

Four sculptures were also found in the frigidarium during the first excavations before 1911: Venus marina, armed Aphrodite, Hermes with child Dionysus, and Ganymede, now in the Naples museum.

References

Zones of Naples
Volcanoes of Italy
Phlegraean Fields